The Great Leap Forward was an economic campaign of the People's Republic of China from 1958 to 1962.

Great Leap Forward may also refer to: 
Great Leap Forward (evolution), a theory explaining behavioral modernity in humans
"The Great Leap Forward" (The 4400 episode)
Great Leap Forward (band), a band formed by former Big Flame member Alan Brown
"Waiting for the Great Leap Forwards", a song by English singer/songwriter Billy Bragg